Denis Lambin (Latinized as Dionysius Lambinus; 1520 – September 1572) was a French classical scholar.

Life
Lambin was born at Montreuil, Pas-de-Calais. Having devoted several years to classical studies during a residence in Italy, he was invited to Paris in 1550 to fill the professorship of Latin in the Collège de France, which he soon afterwards exchanged for that of Greek. His lectures were frequently interrupted by his ill-health and the religious disturbances of the time. His death is said to have been caused by his apprehension that he might share the fate of his friend Pierre de la Ramée, who had been killed in the massacre of St Bartholomew.

Works
Lambin was one of the greatest scholars of his age, and his editions of classical authors are still useful. In textual criticism he was a conservative, but by no means a slavish one; indeed, his opponents accused him of rashness in emendation. His chief defect is that he refers vaguely to his manuscripts without specifying the source of his readings, so that their relative importance cannot be estimated. But his commentaries, with their wealth of illustration and parallel passages, are a mine of information. In the opinion of the best scholars, he preserved the happy mean in his annotations, although his own countrymen have coined the word lambiner to express trifling and diffuseness.

His chief editions are: Horace (1561); Lucretius (1563), on which see H. A. J. Munro's preface to his edition; Cicero (1566); Cornelius Nepos (1569); Demosthenes (1570), completing the unfinished work of Guillaume Morel; and Plautus (1576).

References

Further reading
 Peter Lazer, De Dionysio Lambino narratio, printed in Orelli's Onomasticon Tullianum (i. 1836);
 : Mureti, Lambini, Regii (Paris, 1579);
 John Edwin Sandys, History of Classical Scholarship (1908, ii. 188);
 Adalbert Horawitz in Ersch and Gruber's Allgemeine Encyclopädie.

External links
Titi Lucretii Cari De rerum natura libri sex, published in Paris 1563, later owned and annotated by Montaigne, fully digitised in Cambridge Digital Library
 Lambin's posthumously published Plautus edition at Google Books

1520 births
1572 deaths
People from Montreuil, Pas-de-Calais
French classical scholars